Owana Kaōhelelani Mahealani-Rose Salazar (born October 30, 1953) is a Hawaiian noble and musician. She is thought to be the only female steel guitar player in Hawaii trained by Jerry Byrd.

A descendant of Robert William Wilcox and Theresa Laʻanui, Salazar has been involved in Hawaiian sovereignty issues for many years.

Birth, family and early life
Owana Kaʻohelelani Mahealani-Rose Salazar was born in October 1953. Her parents were Helena Kalokuokamaile Wilcox and Henry Mario Salazar.

Salazar was the only girl in a family of five. "Our family discussions were vast... about many of our ancestors, about their roles in Hawaiiʻs history, about the crown lands, about Robert Wilcox, about Princess Theresa going to Washington, about Princess Elizabeth going to Washington to petition Congress to survey the crown lands."

Salazar was raised on the island of Oahu and graduated from Kamehameha Schools, where she sang with the Concert Glee Club, and the University of Hawaii, where she learned Kihoalu (slack key guitar). Salazar studied hula with the Kumu Hula, Hoʻakalei Kamauʻu, Hoʻoulu Richards and Winona Beamer. In addition to studying traditional western music theory, studied voice with Elizabeth Cole, and studied piano, string methods, guitar, Javanese dance and gamelan as well as continuing to study hula.

Music career
At the start of her public career, Salazar performed with Hawaiian headliners such as Don Ho Ohta-San, Ed Kenney and Charles K.L. Davis. She was introduced to the world of Kihoalu  by friend Nelson Hiu. Combining music theory with her repertoire of Hawaiian songs and slack key, Salazar developed her playing skills with help from her professors and other fellow musicians such as George Kuo, Bla Pahinui, Cyril Pahinui, Dennis Kamakahi, George Kahumoku Jr. and Sonny Chillingworth. Other musical influences include Joni Mitchell, Johnny Mathis, Connie Francis, Stevie Wonder, Genoa Keawe, Gabby Pahinui, Lena Machado, and Marvin Gaye.

Her first recording in 1986, Owana and Kaipo, In Kona was nominated in the category of Most Promising Artist in the Na Hoku Hanohano Awards, a Hawaiian music industry salute. The following year, her second recording, Owana, was a final ballot nominee for Contemporary Hawaiian Album of the Year and Female Vocalist of the Year. Pupukea describes the characteristics of the ocean on the North Shore of Oahu. Kula Morning takes you upcountry Maui, gazing from mountain to the sea. "Na Wai" is a playful poetic expression of love's experiences, full of Hawaiian kaona (hidden meanings). "Kalamaula" celebrates the early homesteading movement of the Hawaiian people. "Silhouette Hula" is a hapa haole piece, recalling the early jazz years of Hawaiian music.

For most of the 1980s, Salazar sang Hawaiian classics with the Royal Hawaiian Band and performed at venues in Waikiki and Japan. Jerry Byrd accepted Salazar as his student for formal study of Hawaiian steel guitar. Eventually, she received a full scholarship from the Hawaiian Steel Guitar Association.  In 1992, she became Byrd's only female graduate and has been called Hawaii's preeminent female steel guitarist. Besides Hawaii, Salazar has also performed in Tahiti, New Zealand, Australia, and the Americas. In January 2000, she became the first woman to tour with the Hawaiian Slack Key Festival along with George Kahumoku, Jr., Keoki Kahumoku and Daniel Ho.

Discography (partial)

 "Owana and Ka'ipo IN KONA" (1986), Nominated: Most Promising Artist of the Year.
Owana (1987), Nominated: Female Vocalist of the Year; Contemporary Hawaiian Album of the Year.
Wahine Slack n’ Steel (2003), Winner: Contemporary Hawaiian Album of the Year. Nominated: Female Vocalist of the Year; Album of the Year.
Hula Jazz (2005), Winner: Jazz Album of the Year; Nominated: Female Vocalist of the Year; Album of the Year; Song of the Year
Hawaiian Slack Key Masters: Volume III, Winner: Grammy Award for Best Hawaiian Music Album
Hawaiian Slack Key Masters: Volume IV, Winner: Grammy Award for Best Hawaiian Music Album

Cultural and sovereignty involvement
Salazar was initiated into the Daughters and Sons of Hawaiian Warriors, Mamakakaua, a lineage society of descendants of Hawaii's ruling chiefs. She served as family liaison to the Mayor's Office of Culture and the Arts for two years, with the goal of planning, commissioning and unveiling a life-size bronze statue of her great-grandfather Robert William Wilcox. His statue was installed at Wilcox Park in downtown Honolulu, on the corner of King and Fort Street.

Claim to the throne of the Hawaiian Kingdom
Salazar rejects the legality of the 1898 annexation of Hawaii by the United States, and as such believes the Hawaiian Kingdom still legally exists. Dismissing the succession right of Abigail Kinoiki Kekaulike Kawānanakoa, Salazar maintains that her own immediate family are rightful rulers of the kingdom, as well as being the legal holders of the former Hawaiian crown lands. This claim is based on descent from King Keōua (d.ca. 1750s/60s) via a niece of Elizabeth Kekaʻaniau (d. 1928), one of 15 children of high aliʻi status attending the Chief's Children's School in 1844 who appear on a list, endorsed by Kamehameha III, of those eligible to be rulers however, genealogist Edith McKenzie stated that; "Everyone on the Chiefs Children's School list was eligible to rule, but it was required that those who did had to be considered and approved by the House of Nobles. Only Kamehameha IV and Emma Rooke ever were."

Honours

Dynastic Orders

Foreign Royal Houses 
  Dame Grand Cordon of the Royal and Hashemite Order of the Pearl
  Medal of Honor (Special Class) of the Association of Monarchic Autarchs of Portugal

Family tree

References

External links

 YouTube - Owana Kaʻōhelelani Kahekili Mahaelani-Rose Salazar. Willie K, "Knight Comander of the Royal Order of the Crown"
 Keouanui.org

1953 births
Living people
Kamehameha Schools alumni
House of Kalokuokamaile
Native Hawaiian musicians
Slack-key guitarists
Native Hawaiian activists
Na Hoku Hanohano Award winners
Pretenders to the Hawaiian throne
Native Hawaiian people
American monarchists